The Battle of Courtrai or Battle of Kortrijk may refer to:
Battle of Courtrai (1302), better known as the Battle of the Golden Spurs, in which the French king fought Flemish militia
Battle of Courtrai (1580), between Spanish Troops and Catholics during the Eighty Years' War
Battle of Courtrai (1793), battle between the French Revolutionary Army and an Austrian-British force
Battle of Courtrai (1794), in which the French Revolutionary Army fought the First Coalition
Battle of Courtrai (1814), battle between French and Saxon troops during the War of the Sixth Coalition
Battle of Courtrai (1815), battle during the Hundred Days of the War of the Seventh Coalition
Battle of Courtrai (1918), the second phase of the northern Allied offensive against the German Hindenburg Line